Decadent Evil (known by the slightly reworked title of Decadent Evil Dead in the UK) is a 2005 vampire film, produced and directed by Charles Band under his Wizard Entertainment banner, released on June 25. The film was shot in and around Los Angeles, California.

The films stars Phil Fondacaro, Debra Mayer, Jill Michelle, Daniel Lennox, Hazell Dean, and Raelyn Hennessee. Porn actress Harmony Rose has a small role as a hooker.

Plot

A fallen foot tall Homunculus called Marvin (a part human/part reptile creature) is imprisoned in a birdcage by a vengeful lover who is bidding to become the world's most powerful vampire.

Footage from Vampire Journals (a spin off from Subspecies (film series)) is used at the beginning of the movie to explain how Morella, the vampire Queen, left her bloodline behind in Europe. The movie ends with Morella transformed into a Homunculus and having sex in the cage with Marvin.

Reception
Critical reception was typically negative. Scott Weinberg reviewed Decadent Evil for DVD Talk, calling it "a mess in just about every sense of the word -- but that won't stop me from checking out his next projects". Felix Vasquez of Cinema Crazed also reviewed the movie, similarly panning it. Kim Newman reviewed both Decadent Evil and Decadent Evil II, criticizing both.

Sequel and legacy
Charles Band directed a sequel to Decadent Evil, Decadent Evil II, in 2007. Jill Michelle with Danniel Lennox returned to star in the film, while the role of Ivan Burroughs was played by Ricardo Gil.  Fondacaro would later reprise the role of Ivan Burroughs in Evil Bong. A character by the name of Ivan Ivanov, played by George Appleby and revealed to be the character Ivan Burroughs, appeared in the 2016 series Ravenwolf Towers.

References

2005 films
American supernatural horror films
Films directed by Charles Band
Puppet films
American vampire films
2005 horror films
2000s English-language films
2000s American films